Up the Hill may refer to:

 Up the Hill (newspaper), a student-run newspaper at Jack and Jill School, Bacolod, Philippines
 "Up the Hill" (Teletubbies), a 2000 television episode
 "Up the Hill", a song by Captain Tractor

See also
 "Up the Hill Backwards", a song by David Bowie